Doctor Who Adventures (abbreviated as DWA) was a British magazine devoted to the science fiction television programme Doctor Who. Originally published by Immediate Media Company, the magazine launched in 2006 to accompany the revived era of the show. It featured news, behind-the-scenes articles, comic strips, puzzles, pull-out posters and information from then-upcoming episodes of the series. Every issue also came with a free gift, usually in the form of stickers, stationary or a small toy. The magazine also covered content from the Doctor Who spin-off programme The Sarah Jane Adventures. Compared to its sister publication, Doctor Who Magazine, Doctor Who Adventures was aimed at a younger readership demographic of 6 to 13-year-olds.

Initially released fortnightly, the magazine became a weekly publication in 2008 before a loss in profits forced it to resume its fortnightly release in 2013. After discontinuing its subscription services, DWA became a monthly publication in 2014, and then bi-monthly in 2016. After issue 363, Panini Comics took over publication and 'rebooted' the magazine, re-starting the issue numbering at 1. In June 2017, after releasing 24 issues, Panini confirmed that publication of the magazine would to be paused, however, a special one-off edition was released in January 2019.

History
Doctor Who Adventures was first published as a fortnightly magazine on 5 April 2006, featuring fact files, puzzles, makes, news guides and more. The regular price for issues 1–33 was £1.99, rising to £2.10 from issue 34. Issue 45, a special "long-read" edition, was £2.99. From issue 47 the magazine became weekly. Doctor Who Adventures is the alternative to Doctor Who Magazine and is aimed at a younger audience,

Design
From issues 1–12 the heading had the Doctor Who logo in a transparent white with the word Adventures in writing filled with the colors from the official Doctor Who logo. Since then, the official Doctor Who logo was used, with the word Adventures being in various colors each issue. From April 2010 the design changed to fit around the newest Doctor (Matt Smith) and the 2010 series occupying it, and featured the new logo. The design then changed a third time from April 2011 to fit around the 2011 Series. The design was changed a fourth time from March 2013 to fit around the 2013 Series, The design then changed for a fifth time from January 2019 to fit around the 2018 Series,

Regular Features (From Issue 313 to 363)
Contents - these are pages 2–3 and include a welcome from The Doctor, a contents of what is in the Issue and a "Monster Watch" at the side. 
This Week/Who News - these are pages 4–5 and include secrets about the newest episode/ latest news of Doctor Who. 
Facts - these are pages 6–7 and include facts about a specific monster, alien, gadget or human. 
Puzzles - these are pages 8–9 and include many puzzles. 
Letters (Doctor, Doctor/Monster Mail) - these are pages 10–11 and include letters to The Doctor from the readers. At the side of page 11 there is a section called Monster Mail which has letters to a different monster each week. 
Competitions - these are pages 12–13 and include a variety of competitions offering various prizes.
 Alien Babies - this is page 14 and is a one-page comic strip about a nursery run by Dorium Maldova which alien babies go to. (See below for a list of "Alien Babies" Characters). 
Whoniverse Collection - these are pages 15–16 and come in different parts (one in each issue) and make a mini-mag when all parts have been collected. 
Advertisement - this is no longer included.
Poster - this is the middle pages (pages 18–19) and is different each issue. 
Puzzles - this is a single page (page 20) with just one puzzle on it. 
Comic Strip - this is pages 21–24 and is a different story each week. (See below for a complete list of comic doctors and Companions. 
Fun - this is a single page (page 25) and has a different make each week. 
LOLS! - this is a single page (page 26) and has jokes and funny made up story's about monsters. 
The Doctor's Guide to the Galaxy! - this is a single page (page 27) in which The Doctor gives the reader information about a certain planet. 
Behind The Scenes - these are pages 28–29 and tell the reader about how the producers made a monster, set, prop etc. 
Where's The Doctor? - these are pages 30–31 and is a Where's Wally? type activity where you have to find The Doctor and his friends and aliens. 
Letters (You Who) - these are pages 32–33 and contains letters that have been sent in by the reader. The best send in (Doctor's Pick) each week wins a prize. 
Poster 2 - this is a single pages poster on page 34.
Next Time - This is the final page of the magazine (page 35) and tells the reader what is in the next issue and when it is out.

Comic characters
Companions

Rose Tyler – 2006–2007
Martha Jones – 2007
Donna Noble – 2008–2009
Heather McCrimmon – 2009–2010
Wolfgang Ryter – 2009, 2010
Amy Pond – 2010–2012
Rory Williams – 2010–2012 
Decky Flamboon – 2012–2013
Pippa – 2013 
Clara Oswald – 2013–2016
Jata - 2016–2017
Yasmin Khan – 2019 
Ryan Sinclair – 2019
Graham O'Brien – 2019

Doctors 
10th Doctor – 2006–2010
11th Doctor – 2010–2014
12th Doctor – 2014–2017
13th Doctor – 2019–

Alien Babies characters
Dorium Maldovar - owner of the nursery.
Blun - A baby Slitheen 
Simon - A baby Cyberman
Strup - A baby Sontaran
Eldast - A baby Silurian
Chas and Chelsea - Baby Cherubs

List of Doctor Who Adventures
2006  -    issues 1-19
2007  -    issues 20-45
2008  -    issues 46-95
2009  -    issues 96-147
2010  -    issues 148-198
2011  -    issues 199-249
2012  -    issues 250-300
2013  -    issues 301-336
2014  -    issues 337-360
2015  -    issues 361-363 & 1-9
2016  -    issues 10-20
2017  -    issues 21-24
2019  -    One off special issue

See also

Doctor Who Magazine
Doctor Who - Battles in Time
Torchwood Magazine

References

Notes

Citations

External links
Official Doctor Who Adventures magazine website
Clockworkrobot.com, were credited for some early paper engineering features.
Official website for Doctor Who

BBC publications
British comics titles
Weekly magazines published in the United Kingdom
Children's magazines published in the United Kingdom
Doctor Who magazines
Comics based on Doctor Who
Magazines established in 2006
Magazines disestablished in 2017
2006 establishments in the United Kingdom
2017 disestablishments in the United Kingdom